James R. Ludlow School is a historic K-8 elementary school within the School District of Philadelphia, located in the Yorktown neighborhood of Philadelphia, Pennsylvania. 

The school building is a Gothic Revival structure designed by architect Irwin T. Catharine (1883–1944) and built in 1926–1927. It is a heavily constructed three-story brick building, nine bays wide with projecting end bays in the Late Gothic Revival-style. Like many similarly-designed Gothic Revival schools in Philadelphia, it features rib vault, heavily tiled corridors, and a stone entrance pavilion with a Tudor-arched opening. The school was named for the Hon. James Reilly Ludlow, or “Judge Ludlow” (1825-1886), President Judge of Court of Common Pleas, No. 3, in Philadelphia, Pennsylvania, and a distinguished graduate of the University of Pennsylvania.  The building was added to the National Register of Historic Places in 1988.

Ludlow School is located near the National Shrine of St. John Neumann, and near Philadelphia’s up-and-coming Fishtown neighborhood.  St. John Neumann was a Bishop of Philadelphia who largely organized and expanded Philadelphia's diocesan school system.

References

External links

 https://ludlow.philasd.org
 https://www.greatschools.org/pennsylvania/philadelphia/1982-Ludlow-James-R-School/
 Irwin T. Catharine (Architect) https://www.philadelphiabuildings.org/pab/app/ar_display.cfm/22844
 https://www.visitphilly.com/areas/philadelphia-neighborhoods/fishtown/
 https://stjohnneumann.org
 About Hon. James R. Ludlow
 Picture of Hon. James R. Ludlow

School buildings on the National Register of Historic Places in Philadelphia
Gothic Revival architecture in Pennsylvania
School buildings completed in 1927
Lower North Philadelphia
Elementary schools in Philadelphia
School District of Philadelphia
1927 establishments in Pennsylvania